The Vermont Reds are a defunct minor league baseball team. They played in the Eastern League at Centennial Field in Burlington, Vermont from 1984 to 1987. They were affiliated with the Cincinnati Reds.

The team won the Eastern League Championship in 1984, 1985 and 1986.

History
Prior to their four-year stint as the Vermont Reds, this franchise was known as the Lynn Sailors from 1980 to 1983 and served as the Double-A affiliate of the Seattle Mariners (1980 to 1982) and Pittsburgh Pirates (1983).

In 1984, owner Mike Agganis moved the Lynn Pirates from Lynn, Massachusetts to Burlington, and Agganis signed a four-year agreement with the Cincinnati Reds. The club was renamed the Vermont Reds.

After the stint as the Vermont Reds, the franchise again served as the Double-A affiliate of the Seattle Mariners in 1988, becoming the Vermont Mariners.  Today, the franchise is the Double-A affiliate of the Cleveland Guardians and is known as the Akron RubberDucks.

Notable players

Jack Armstrong
Keith Brown
Marty Brown
Bob Buchanan
Norm Charlton
Jeff Cox
Kal Daniels
Iván DeJesús
Rob Dibble
Orlando González
Jeff Gray
Lenny Harris
Chris Jones
Tracy Jones
Barry Larkin
Terr Lee
Jack Lind
Terry McGriff
Lloyd McClendon
Gino Minutelli
Jeff Montgomery
Rob Murphy
Joe Oliver
Paul O'Neill
Pat Pacillo
Jeff Richardson
Mike Roesler
Chris Sabo
Mike Smith (born 1961)
Mike Smith (born 1963)
Scott Terry
Jeff Treadway

References

External links
 Team history

Defunct Eastern League (1938–present) teams
Cincinnati Reds minor league affiliates
Sports in Burlington, Vermont
1984 establishments in Vermont
1987 disestablishments in Vermont
Professional baseball teams in Vermont
Defunct baseball teams in Vermont
Baseball teams disestablished in 1987
Baseball teams established in 1984